Joffre was the planned lead ship of her class of aircraft carriers for the French Navy. She was named in honour of Joseph Joffre. The ship was laid down in 1938, but never launched.

Description 

After several experimentations on the aircraft carrier , the French Navy decided to have two full-fledged aircraft carriers built as replacement. They were to be 18,000 tons (Washington) with a protection limited to the hull and comparable to that of a light cruiser. Armament was to include dual-purpose guns fore and aft of the island, and several light anti-aircraft guns. The flight deck, which was offset to port to counterbalance the weight of the unusually large island, ran to the bows but stopped before the poop because one external lift was to be installed aft of the flight deck. The other lift was T-shaped and installed in front of the island. The ship had two superimposed hangars, the upper being  and the lower .

The ships were to operate an air group of around 40 planes, including 15 Dewoitine D.790 fighters (a navalised version of the Dewoitine D.520) and 25 Breguet 810 twin-engine attack planes (a navalised version of the Breguet 693) for level bombing, torpedo missions and scouting.

History 
Joffre was laid down on 26 November 1938 at the shipyards of Ateliers et Chantiers de Saint-Nazaire Penhoët, but work was slowed by the start of World War II. The work was ultimately halted in June 1940 when France fell to German invasion. At this time, the ship was 20% complete. The assembled hull was later scrapped in the dock.

References 

 
 Francis Dousset, Les porte-avions français des origines (1911) à nos jours, 1978 éditions de la Cité, 

Joffre-class aircraft carriers
Proposed aircraft carriers
Ships built in France
1938 ships